Tsygan ("Gypsy") may refer to:

Mykola Tsygan, Russian/Ukrainian football goalkeeper
Boris Tsygan, Ukrainian American mathematician, the author of the concept of cyclic homology 
Tsygan, a Soviet space dog

See also
Tsyganov, Russian surname

Russian-language surnames